Chertsey is a town in England.

Chertsey may also refer to:
 Chertsey, Quebec, a municipality in Quebec
 Chertsey, New Zealand, a town in New Zealand
 Chertsey (UK Parliament constituency)